Michael Lumsden may refer to:

 Michael Lumsden (born 1955), English TV and stage actor, known from The Bill, Casualty or House of Anubis
 John Michael G. Lumsden (born 1927), better known as Jack Lumsden, British modern pentathlete